is a Buddhist temple in Kyoto, Japan.

History 
It was built in the late 13th century.  Shinran Shonin, the founder of the Jodo Shinshu pure land sect, was ordained a monk at Shōren-in at the age of nine.

Shōren-in was formerly the temple of the imperial abbot of the Tendai headquarters on Mount Hiei; the abbot was required to be chosen from the imperial family or high court aristocracy. After the Great Kyoto Fire of 1788, it was used as a temporary imperial palace for Empress Go-Sakuramachi. It was therefore also known as the Awata Palace. Her study room was converted into a tea room called Kobun-tei. The main hall was rebuilt in 1895.

The temple complex contains a garden with massive eight-hundred-year-old camphor trees (kusunoki), and a pond filled with large stones and fed by a small waterfall.

The modern artist Hideki Kimura created a number of fusuma sliding doors with blue lotus motifs to evoke the Pure Land.

See also 
 For an explanation of terms concerning Japanese Buddhism, Japanese Buddhist art, and Japanese Buddhist temple architecture, see the Glossary of Japanese Buddhism.
List of National Treasures of Japan (paintings)
 Gran Turismo 5 - Part of photos travel.

References 

Apparent to Photo Travel.

External links

Shorenin Official website(Japanese)
Shorenin Official website(English)

Buddhist temples in Kyoto
Tendai temples
Historic Sites of Japan
Shinran
Monzeki